Out Distance was 7th a Czech resistance group during World War II sent by Special Group D of the MoD of Czechoslovak government in exile in London,  operating in the Protectorate of Bohemia and Moravia (part of occupied Czechoslovakia).

Operations
At 2AM on 28 March 1942, the group parachuted from a British Halifax plane that also carried the failed group Zink. Their plan had involved the sabotage of gasworks in Prague, providing radio-sets to other resistance fighters, and navigating bombers to the Škoda Works in Pilsen.

Due to a navigation error, the parachutists did not land where they had planned (they landed instead at Ořechov), and having lost a significant amount of material and being chased by Gestapo, the group members decided to split and operate on their own. One member of the group, Ivan Kolařík, after he lost fis fake ID committed suicide on 1 April 1942 in a futile effort to protect members of his family against reprisals after his cover was blown.

First Lieutenant Adolf Opálka, and Karel Čurda went to Prague and joined Operation Anthropoid, a group preparing to assassinate Reinhard Heydrich. Opálka was ordered to take overall command over the parachute groups after he joined with the groups Silver A. The assassination was successful, but Čurda who was went to his mother in Nová Hlína to hide and after the mass executions started during the second martial law he did not  withstand the psychical pressure and wanted to save his family so when it was announced that those who knew anything about the atackers will be spared he decided to betray his military oath and reveal to Gestapo information that led to the finding of the hiding place of the assassins (Prague's Ss. Cyril and Methodius Cathedral) by the Gestapo. Following a fierce battle around the church, Opálka and others were killed in combat or committed suicide rather than be caught. Čurda helped identify the corpses of other members of parachute groups. For this he received part of 10 000 000 K reward promissed by occupiers.

After the war, Čurda was captured and tried by extraordinary peoples court that senteced him to be hanged for treason at Pankrác Prison on 29 April 1947.

References

External links
  Out Distance parachute memorial
  Who was who in Czechoslovak history

Czech resistance groups
People killed by Nazi Germany
Czechoslovak soldiers
Operation Anthropoid